Felice Fanetti (20 February 1914 – 25 April 1974) was an Italian rower who competed in the 1948 Summer Olympics. He was born in Cremona.

In 1948 he won the bronze medal with his partner Bruno Boni in the coxless pair event.

References

External links
 
 
 
 

1914 births
1974 deaths
Italian male rowers
Olympic rowers of Italy
Rowers at the 1948 Summer Olympics
Olympic bronze medalists for Italy
Sportspeople from Cremona
Olympic medalists in rowing
Medalists at the 1948 Summer Olympics
European Rowing Championships medalists
20th-century Italian people